Daniel Buballa (born 11 May 1990) is a German professional footballer who plays as a defender for Viktoria Köln in the 3. Liga.

References

External links
 

1990 births
Living people
German footballers
Association football defenders
1. FSV Mainz 05 players
1. FSV Mainz 05 II players
VfR Aalen players
FC St. Pauli players
FC Viktoria Köln players
2. Bundesliga players
3. Liga players
Regionalliga players
People from Bergisch Gladbach
Sportspeople from Cologne (region)
Footballers from North Rhine-Westphalia